Alfredo Francisco Lugo Oñate (born 11 November 1958) is a Mexican politician from the Institutional Revolutionary Party. From 2009 to 2012 he served as Deputy of the LXI Legislature of the Mexican Congress representing Querétaro.

References

1958 births
Living people
Politicians from Querétaro
Institutional Revolutionary Party politicians
21st-century Mexican politicians
Monterrey Institute of Technology and Higher Education alumni
Autonomous University of Queretaro alumni
Deputies of the LXI Legislature of Mexico
Members of the Chamber of Deputies (Mexico) for Querétaro